Senator Rankin may refer to:

Bob Rankin (fl. 2010s), Colorado State Senate
Francis H. Rankin Sr. (1818–1900), Michigan State Senate
John Walker Rankin (1823–1869), Iowa State Senate
Joseph Rankin (1833–1886), Wisconsin State Senate
Luke A. Rankin (born 1962), South Carolina Senate